Judith Mbougnade (born July 11, 1998) is a boxer from the Central African Republic. She competed at the 2016 Summer Olympics in the women's flyweight event, in which she was eliminated in the round of 16 by Ingrit Valencia.

References

External links

1998 births
Living people
Central African Republic women boxers
Olympic boxers of the Central African Republic
Boxers at the 2016 Summer Olympics
Flyweight boxers